The definist fallacy (sometimes called the Socratic fallacy, after Socrates) is a logical fallacy, identified by William Frankena in 1939, that involves the definition of one property in terms of another.

Overview
The philosopher William Frankena first used the term definist fallacy in a paper published in the British analytic philosophy journal Mind in 1939. In this article he generalized and critiqued G. E. Moore's naturalistic fallacy, which argued that good cannot be defined by natural properties, as a broader confusion caused by attempting to define a term using non-synonymous properties. Frankena argued that naturalistic fallacy is a complete misnomer because it is neither limited to naturalistic properties nor necessarily a fallacy. On the first word (naturalistic), he noted that Moore rejected defining good in non-natural as well as natural terms.

On the second word (fallacy), Frankena rejected the idea that it represented an error in reasoning – a fallacy as it is usually recognized – rather than an error in semantics. In Moore's open-question argument, because questions such as "Is that which is pleasurable good?" have no definitive answer, then pleasurable is not synonymous with good. Frankena rejected this argument as: the fact that there is always an open question, merely reflects the fact that it makes sense to ask whether two things that may be identical in fact are. Thus, even if good were identical to pleasurable, it makes sense to ask whether it is; the answer may be "yes", but the question was legitimate. This seems to contradict Moore's view which accepts that sometimes alternative answers could be dismissed without argument, however Frankena objects that this would be committing the fallacy of begging the question.

See also
 List of fallacies

References

Informal fallacies